John Dramani Mahama (born 29 November 1958) is a Ghanaian politician who served as President of Ghana from 24 July 2012 to 7 January 2017. He previously served as Vice President of Ghana from January 2009 to July 2012, and took office as president on 24 July 2012 following the death of his predecessor John Evans Fiifi Attah Mills. Mahama is a communication expert, historian, and writer. Dramani is the first vice president to take over the presidency from the death of his predecessor, John Evans Atta Mills, and is the first head of state of Ghana to have been born after Ghana's independence. He was elected after December 2012 election to serve as full-time President. He contested re-election for a second term in the 2016 election, but lost to the New Patriotic Party candidate Nana Akufo-Addo, in 2012. This made him the first President in the history of Ghana to not have won a second term.

Early years
A member of the Gonja ethnic group in the Savanna region of Ghana, Mahama hails from Bole in the Savanna Region. Mahama was born in Damongo in the Damango-Daboya constituency of Northern region into a political tradition dating back to the country's First Republic. His father, Emmanuel Adama Mahama, a wealthy rice farmer and teacher, was the first Member of Parliament for the West Gonja constituency and the first Regional Commissioner of the Northern Region during the First Republic under Ghana's first president, Kwame Nkrumah. Mahama's father also served as a senior presidential advisor during Ghana's Third Republic under Hilla Limann who was overthrown in 1981 by Jerry Rawlings.

Mahama had his primary education at the Accra Newtown Experimental School (ANT1) before going to boarding school at Achimota Primary School. He completed secondary school at Ghana Secondary School (Tamale, Northern region). He proceeded to the University of Ghana, Legon, receiving a bachelor's degree in history in 1981 and a postgraduate diploma in communication studies in 1986. As a student, he was a member of Commonwealth Hall (Legon). He also studied at the Institute of Social Sciences in Moscow in the Soviet Union, specializing in social psychology; he obtained a postgraduate degree in 1988.

Early career
After completing his undergraduate education, Mahama taught history at the secondary school level for a few years. Upon his return to Ghana after studying in Moscow, he worked as the Information, Culture and Research Officer at the Embassy of Japan in Accra between 1991 and 1995. From there he moved to the anti-poverty non-governmental organisation (NGO) Plan International's Ghana Country Office, where he worked as International Relations, Sponsorship Communications and Grants Manager between 1995 and 1996. In 1993, he participated in a professional training course for Overseas Public Relations Staff, organized by the Japanese Ministry of Foreign Affairs in Tokyo. He also participated in a management development course organized by Plan International (RESA) in Nairobi, Kenya.

Political appointments

As Member of Parliament 
Mahama was first elected to the Parliament of Ghana in the 1996 elections to represent the Bole/Bamboi Constituency for a four-year term. In April 1997, Mahama was appointed Deputy Minister of Communications. He was promoted to the post of Minister of Communications in November 1998, serving in that post until January 2001, when the ruling National Democratic Congress (NDC) handed over power to the New Patriotic Party's government.

In 2000, Mahama was re-elected for another four-year term as the Member of Parliament for the Bole/Bamboi Constituency. He was again re-elected in 2004 for a third term. From 2001 to 2004, Mahama served as the Minority Parliamentary Spokesman for Communications. In 2002, he was appointed the Director of Communications for the NDC. That same year, he served as a member of the team of International Observers selected to monitor Zimbabwe's Parliamentary Elections. As an MP, he was a member of Standing Orders Committee as well as the Transport, Industry, Energy, Communications, Science and Technology Committee of Parliament.

As Minister and Vice-President 
Mahama served as the Deputy Minister of Communications between April 1997 and November 1998. During his tenure as Minister for Communications, Mahama also served as the Chairman of the National Communications Authority, in which capacity he played a key role in stabilising Ghana's telecommunications sector after it was deregulated in 1997. As a minister, he was a founding member of the Ghana AIDS Commission, a member of the implementation committee of the 2000 National Population Census and a deputy chairman of the Publicity Committee for the re-introduction of the Value Added Tax (VAT).

Continuing to expand his interest and involvement in international affairs, in 2003 Mahama became a member of the Pan-African Parliament, serving as the Chairperson of the West African Caucus until 2011. He was also a member of European and Pan African Parliaments' Ad hoc Committee on Cooperation. In 2005 he was, additionally, appointed the Minority Spokesman for Foreign Affairs. He is a member of the UNDP Advisory Committee on Conflict Resolution in Ghana.

On 7 January 2009, Mahama became the Vice-President of Ghana after John Evan Atta Mills won the 2008 Ghana general Elections. He also served as the Chairman of the National Economic Management Team, the Armed Forces Council of Ghana, the Decentralisation and Implementation Committee and the Police Council of Ghana in this capacity.

As President 

In line with Ghana's constitution, Mahama became President of Ghana on 24 July 2012 on the death of his predecessor, John Atta Mills. In July 2012, he became the Ghana's first president to have served at all levels of political office (Ghanaian and Pan-African MP, Deputy Minister, Minister, vice-president and President). He said in parliament upon being sworn in:
This is the saddest day in our nation's history. Tears have engulfed our nation and we are deeply saddened and distraught and I'm personally devastated, I've lost a father, I've lost a friend, I've lost a mentor and a senior comrade. Ghana is united in grief at this time for our departed president.

As a result of his elevation to the presidency, Mahama made political history by becoming the first Ghanaian head of state to have been born after Ghana's declaration of independence on 6 March 1957. The National Democratic Congress (NDC) held a Special National Delegates Congress on 30 August 2012 and endorsed President John Dramani Mahama as its 2012 presidential candidate. President Mahama, the sole candidate of the party, polled 2, 767 votes, representing 99.5% of total votes cast, to pick the slot for the party. Mahama has stated that his administration is deeply committed to continuing the Better Ghana Agenda started under President Mills.

Mahama won the December 2012 general election with 50.70% of the total valid votes cast and a 3% winning margin beating his nearest rival, Nana Akufo-Addo of the main opposition New Patriotic Party, who polled a close 47.74%.  This was just barely enough to win the presidency without the need for a runoff. In addition, Mahama won the majority of valid votes cast in eight out of Ghana's ten administrative regions. Thirteen African Heads of State, one Prime Minister, two vice-presidents and 18 government delegations across the world attended his inaugural ceremony at the Black Star Square in Accra on 7 January 2013, when Mahama was sworn in to begin his own four-year term.

After his investiture, the opposition New Patriotic Party led by its 2012 presidential candidate Nana Akufo-Addo, running mate Dr Mahamudu Bawumia and the party chairman Jacob Otanka Obetsebi-Lamptey, challenged the election results, alleging irregularities, malpractices, omissions and violations. The petition was heard by nine justices of the Supreme Court of Ghana. After eight months of hearing, the Court on 29 August 2013 dismissed the petition by a majority opinion.

Mahama is one of Africa's most-followed leaders on the social networking sites, Twitter and Facebook. In May 2013, he stated that all of West Africa is under the threat of Islamist militancy.

On 30 March 2014, he was elected to preside over ECOWAS. On 26 June 2014, he was elected Chairperson of the African Union's (AU's) High-Level African Trade Committee (HATC).

On 21 January 2016 on the occasion of the World Economic Forum in Davos, Mahama became co-chair of the Sustainable Development Goals Advocates group which consists of 17 eminent persons assisting the UN Secretary-General in the campaign to achieve the Sustainable Development Goals (SDGs) that world leaders unanimously adopted in September 2015. With a mandate to support the Secretary-General in his efforts to generate momentum and commitment to achieve the SDGs by 2030, the SDG Advocates have been working to promote the universal sustainable development agenda, to raise awareness of the integrated nature of the SDGs, and to foster the engagement of new stakeholders in the implementation of these Goals.

Mahama sought a second full term at the December 2016 general election. He was eligible for a second full term since he ascended to the presidency with only six months remaining in Mills' term. In Ghana, a vice president who ascends to the presidency is allowed to run for two full terms in his own right if more than half of his predecessor's term has expired. He was defeated by main opposition leader Akufo-Addo in a rematch from four years earlier, and conceded defeat on election night. Mahama polled 44.4% of the valid votes cast compared to Akufo-Addo's 53.5%.

In December 2016, he was part of the ECOWAS mediation team to resolve the post-election political impasse in The Gambia between the defeated incumbent, Yahya Jammeh and declared winner, Adam Barrow.

2020 presidential bid 
In February 2019, Mahama was confirmed as the candidate of the opposition National Democratic Congress to contest in the 2020 elections, the incumbent president Nana Akufo-Addo who unseated Mahama in a 2016 election, capitalizing on an economy that was slowing due to falling prices for gold, oil and cocoa exports. He won the National Democratic Congress primaries by securing an overwhelming 213,487 votes representing 95.23 percent of the total valid votes cast with the other six contenders managing with about 4 percent of the votes.

On 4 December 2020, Mahama and incumbent President Nana Akufo-Addo, who he faced both in the 2012 and 2016 Ghanaian presidential elections, signed a peace pact to ensure peace before, during, and after the 7 December elections. Akufo-Addo won the election with 51.6% of the vote.

In August 2021, Mahama began a tour  dubbed 'Thank you tour' in Ghana to thank Ghanaians for voting in the 2020 presidential election. He visited Upper West, Upper East, North East, Northern and Savannah regions in the first phase. He met Chiefs and Queens, religious leaders and also interacted with the media.

Personal life and interests

Mahama is married to Lordina Mahama (née Effah, 6 March 1963). Mahama has five children named Shafik, Shahid, Sharaf, who formerly played for Rostocker FC as a striker, Jesse and Farida. He is a Christian, born and raised a Presbyterian but is now a member of the Assemblies of God, Ghana by marriage. His family is multi-faith, consisting of Christians and Muslims. Being a staunch campaigner for sustainability, he has a keen interest in environmental affairs, particularly the problem of single-use plastic waste pollution in Africa, which he committed himself to addressing during his tenure as vice president.

Over the course of his career, Mahama has written for several newspapers and other publications both locally and internationally. As a Parliamentarian, Mahama wrote Mahama's Hammer, a semi-regular column in a Ghanaian newspaper. His essays have also been published in the Daily Graphic, Ebony, Huffington Post, the Louisville Courier-Journal, the New York Times and The Root. Additionally, he was a featured speaker at the TEDx Great Pacific Garbage Patch Conference in Santa Monica. Mahama is also a devotee of Afrobeat music, especially that of Fela Kuti. Apart from his hobby of reading, Mahama also has a passionate interest in innovation particularly the use of technology in agriculture being a farmer himself. In particular, he is interested in finding the most effective ways to improve agricultural productivity and works to encourage more young people to see farming as a viable business and not a subsistence activity. This has translated into his passion to see the Savanna Accelerated Development Authority (SADA) create new opportunities for people living in the Savanna areas of the country, which includes the three Northern Regions, and the Volta Region. Even on official assignments outside of country, Mahama likes to take advantage of opportunities to visit agricultural establishments and update himself on current trends and developments. He also takes keen interest in the opportunities for simplifying and making tasks easier with the use of information and communications technology, and considers the ICT industry one of the sectors that can play a significant role in economic transformation and job creation. He's an avid fan of motor biking and owns about 5 of them. Mahama is the elder brother of Ghanaian businessman Ibrahim Mahama who owns Dzata Cement.

Books
Mahama's first book, a memoir called My First Coup d'État: Memories from the Lost Decades of Africa, was published by Bloomsbury on 3 July 2012. The most promising son of an affluent government minister, he spent his childhood shuttling in his father's chauffeur-driven cars, from his elite boarding school Achimota School in Accra to his many homes. He recalls in its first chapter the day in 1966 when he learned of the ousting of Ghana's founding president, Kwame Nkrumah, in a military coup: "When I look back on my life it's clear to me that this moment marked the awakening of my consciousness. It changed my life and influenced all the moments that followed."

Corruption allegations
It was revealed in 2016 that Mahama accepted a Ford Expedition from a construction firm bidding for a lucrative government contract in 2012, while he was serving as vice president. The Burkinabe contractor who had previously constructed a wall at the Ghanaian Embassy in Ouagadougou was at the time looking to get a road-building contract in Ghana's Volta region; this contractor later secured the contract but the vehicle in question had already been added to the government's fleet of cars by the ex president for Government use. Under Mahama's presidency in 2014, massive corruption was discovered at Ghana's Savannah Accelerated Development Authority (SADA). The authority had misappropriated millions of dollars allocated to it. SADA paid GH₵32,498,000 to ACICL, a business owned by Ghana's Roland Agambire, Mahama's close confidante, to plant five million trees in the savannah zone, but could only account for about 700,000 trees. It was also discovered that SADA spent GH¢15 million on guinea fowl, but could only account for a few of the birds. In 2015 it was again discovered that the contract for the rebranding of 116 Metro Mass Transit (MMT) buses at a cost of Gh₵3,600,000 was sole sourced and awarded to a company named "Smarttys," owned by a member of the ruling NDC activist Selassie Ibrahim. It was revealed that the rebranding of the buses cost the government Gh₵3,600,000 which at the time was more than the cost of the 116 buses, the money lost was eventually refunded through the Attorney General's office.

Honours and awards
Mahama received an honorary doctorate in the field of Public Administration, from the Ekiti State University of Nigeria, formerly affiliated to the Obafemi Awolowo University in "recognition of his politico-socio economic development of Ghana and Africa at various stages of his political career." Later the same university passed a resolution to name its Faculty of Management Science after him. 
The Cuban government, recognising Mahama's relentless advocacy for the Cuban cause, namely for the lifting of the 50-year economic embargo on the communist country and for the freedom of the detained Cuban five by the United States government, conferred on him the Friendship Medal. The General Council of Assemblies of God, Ghana honoured Mahama with its Daniel Award. The Graduate School of Governance and Leadership also awarded him the African Servant Leadership Award while the Institute of Public Relations recognized Mahama with a prize for his leadership acumen and technocratic flair. In 2013, the Forum for Agricultural Research in Africa (FARA) conferred on Mahama the Africa Award for Excellence in Food Security and Poverty Reduction. In March 2016, University of Aberdeen held a special convocation to confer an honorary degree of Doctors of Laws (LLD) on President John Mahama.

Mahama has also attended numerous conferences and won many fellowships, including a study as a visiting scholar at Johns Hopkins University, Baltimore, United States. He is also a Bill Gates Fellow. He was awarded the Great Cross of the National Order of Benin, the highest award in Benin, by President Yayi Boni.

In February 2017, Mahama received the 2016 African Political Leader of the Year Award from the African Leadership Magazine in South Africa.

In October 2022, Mahama was honored by Liberty University with a Global Leadership and Economic Impact Award in Virginia, USA.

See also
List of Mills government ministers
List of Mahama government ministers

References

External links
 
 
 

|-

|-

|-

|-

|-

|-

1958 births
20th-century Ghanaian historians
21st-century Ghanaian historians
Alumni of Achimota School
Communications ministers of Ghana
Former Presbyterians
Ghanaian civil servants
Ghanaian commanders in chief
Ghanaian MPs 1997–2001
Ghanaian MPs 2001–2005
Ghanaian MPs 2005–2009
Ghanaian Pentecostals
Living people
Members of the Pan-African Parliament from Ghana
National Democratic Congress (Ghana) politicians
People from Northern Region (Ghana)
Presidents of Ghana
University of Ghana alumni
Vice-presidents of Ghana
Government ministers of Ghana
21st-century Ghanaian politicians
Ghana Senior High School (Tamale) alumni